John Kenney may refer to:
John Kenney (baseball) (1844–1893), American baseball player
W. John Kenney (1905–1992), Assistant Secretary of the United States Navy
John A. Kenney Jr. (1914–2003), American dermatologist
John A. Kenney Sr. (1874–1950), American surgeon and father of John Jr.
John T. Kenney (1911–1972), English illustrator
John Kenney, a contestant on the reality TV show Survivor: Vanuatu